Cristofer is a phonetic spelling of Christopher sometimes used in Spanish. The Spanish version of Christopher is Cristóbal.

"Cristofer" can also be a Latin spelling of the name "Christopher."

People
Cristofer Soto, Peruvian footballer
Cristofer Suárez, Ecuadorian footballer
John Cristofer Valladares, Chilean footballer